The following list of missiles of the Royal Air Force contains both current and former missiles used by the British air force:

A 
AS.11 - Air-to-surface anti-tank missile. Carried by the Westland Wessex and Westland Whirlwind helicopters
AS.12 - Air-to-surface anti-tank missile. Carried by the Westland Wessex and Hawker Siddeley Nimrod
AS-30 - Air-to-surface missile. Carried by the English Electric Canberra
ALARM - Air-to-surface anti-radiation missile. Carried by the Panavia Tornado
AMRAAM - Medium-range air-to-air missile. Carried by the Eurofighter Typhoon and Panavia Tornado ADV
ASRAAM - Short-range infrared homing air-to-air missile. Carried by the Eurofighter Typhoon and Panavia Tornado.

B 
Bloodhound - Obsolete land-based surface-to-air missile. In RAF service 1958 to 1991.
Blue Steel - Obsolete air-to-surface nuclear armed missile. Carried by the Avro Vulcan and Handley Page Victor V Bombers. In RAF from 1963 to 1970.
Brimstone - Air-to-surface ground-attack missile. Carried by the Panavia Tornado and Eurofighter Typhoon.

F 
Fireflash - Obsolete infrared homing air-to-air missile. Carried by Gloster Meteor and Supermarine Swift test aircraft. In RAF service from 1955 to 1958.
Firestreak - Obsolete air-to-air missile. Carried by the English Electric Lightning and Gloster Javelin. In RAF service from 1957 to 1988.

H 
Harpoon - Air-to-surface all-weather over-the-horizon anti-ship missile. Carried by the Hawker Siddeley Nimrod.
Hellfire - Air-to-surface anti-tank missile.

M 
Martel - Anglo-French air-to-surface anti-radiation missile. Carried by the Blackburn Buccaneer and Hawker Siddeley Nimrod. Retired.
Maverick - Air-to-surface missile. Carried by the British Aerospace Harrier II, Hawker Siddeley Nimros and Panavia Tornado.
Meteor - Air-to-air active radar homing beyond-visual-range missile.

R 
Rapier - Land-based surface-to-air missile operated by the RAF Regiment.
Red Top - Obsolete infrared homing air-to-air missile. Carried by the English Electric Lightning. In RAF service from 1964 to 1988.

S 
Sea Eagle - Air-to-surface sea-skimming anti-ship missile. Carried by the Blackburn Buccaneer and Panavia Tornado. Retired.
Shrike - Air-to-surface anti-radiation missile. Carried by the Avro Vulcan.
Sidewinder - Short-range air-to-air missile. Carried by the Blackburn Buccaneer and British Aerospace Harrier II, Hawker Siddeley Harrier, Hawker Siddeley Hawk, Hawker Siddeley Nimrod McDonnell Douglas Phantom, SEPECAT Jaguar Panavia Tornado and Panavia Tornado ADV.
Skyflash - Obsolete medium-range semi-active radar homing air-to-air missile. In RAF service from 1978 to 2006. Carried by the McDonnell Douglas Phantom and Panavia Tornado ADV.
Sparrow - Medium-range semi-active radar homing air-to-air missile. Carried by the McDonnell Douglas Phantom.
Storm Shadow - Anglo-French air-launched cruise missile. Carried by the Panavia Tornado and Eurofighter Typhoon.

T 
Tigercat - Obsolete short-range surface-to-air missile system. Operated by the RAF Regiment form 1967 to 1978. Replaced by the Rapier surface to air missile.
Thor - Obsolete Land-based intermediate-range ballistic missile. In RAF service from 1959 to 1963. See Project Emily

Unguided  Rockets

Unguided air-to-surface rockets 
2-inch RP air-to-air, air-to-surface rockets. Retired 
RP-3 air-to-surface rockets. Retired
SNEB 68-mm air-to-surface rocket  pods
CRV7 air-to-surface rocket pods
 11-kg (25-lb) 76.2-mm (3-inch) air-to-surface rockets. Retired
 28-kg (60-lb) air-to-surface rockets

Laser-guided bombs
Paveway
Paveway IV
Paveway III
GBU-12
GBU-24

Homing torpedoes

Mark 24 mine - Obsolete
18" Mark 30 torpedo - Carried by Avro Shackleton and Hawker Siddeley Nimrod. In service from 1954 to 1975.
Mark 44 torpedo
Mark 46 torpedo - Carried by the Hawker Siddeley Nimrod
Marconi String Ray Torpedo - Carried by the Hawker Siddeley Nimrod

List of Royal Air Force munitions

Bomb 1918-1939
 Cooper bombs

Bombs 1939-1945
 Blockbuster bomb - Carried by the Avro Lancaster, de Havilland Mosquito and Vickers Wellington.
 Bouncing bomb - Carried by the Avro Lancaster.
 Grand Slam bomb -Carried by the Avro Lancaster.
 Tallboy bomb - Carried by the Avro Lancaster.

Bombs
 BL755 cluster bomb - Withdrawn from service in 2007 and 2008.
 JP233 anti-runway weapon.

Sea mines
Stonefish

List of nuclear weapons of the RAF

Nuclear missiles 1950s-1990s

Missiles
Guided missiles of the United Kingdom
Royal Air Force